Biron Howe House (18 December 1884 – 3 June 1930) played first-class cricket for Somerset in three matches between 1912 and 1914. He was born at Langport, Somerset and died at Creech St Michael, also in Somerset.

House was a wicketkeeper and a lower-order batsman. He made only 30 runs in first-class innings and took just three catches. In his first-ever match, he batted at No 11 and scored an unbeaten 19 out of a last-wicket partnership of 34 with Elliot Tillard in the match against Gloucestershire. This was his highest first-class score.

References

1884 births
1930 deaths
English cricketers
Somerset cricketers
People from Langport